Āina-kāri is a kind of interior decoration where artists assemble finely cut mirrors together in geometric, calligraphic or foliage forms (inspired by flowers and other plants). This creates a beautiful shining surface covered with complex facets, reflecting light as intricate abstract patterns or glittering reflections. Beside their decorative use, this art is used as a strong durable cover for an interior space of a building. This type of mosaic work is commonly done in Iran, Pakistan, Afghanistan and is also found is Mughal era buildings of India. 

In the Zand and Qajar periods, this craft was applied over doorways, window-frames, walls, ceilings, and columns in pavilions and private houses, tea-houses and zūrḵānas, as well as royal buildings and shrines. The funerary complex of Shah Cheragh in Shiraz, Iran, features extensive use of Āina-kāri mirrorwork. It also appears as an external architectural facade, within semi-domed ayvāns that mark the entrance of tālārs, courtyards, gardens and reflecting pools. 

Elements of this craft have been attributed to Venetian glassmakers invited to Iran by Shah ʿAbbās I in the 17th century. This art form may have also evolved from the creative reuse of shattered fragments of imported mirrors, reminiscent of kintsugi and influenced by Sufi philosophy regarding the symbolism of broken objects and reflected light. By the 19th century, affluent homes in Isfahan featured a 'mirror room' as a reception space, in which mirror work was combined with carved stucco and the display of artist's prints. 

Āina-kāri is closely associated with sculptures by contemporary artists such as Monir Shahroudy Farmanfarmaian and Timo Nasseri. Artworks like these are either been made in collaboration with Iranian artisans, or seek to reproduce the appearance of this craft in materials such as stainless steel. Contemporary furniture and interior designers have also adapted this craft for new audiences, such as the restaurant of the Islamic Arts Museum Malaysia. 

When interviewed in 2013 about the use of Persian mirror work in contemporary art, Timo Nasseri said:

"I chose the mirrors for different reasons. I liked the idea that the mirrors in the sculpture reflect themselves. What can you see in a mirror that reflects another mirror? As you see, this is an abstraction of infinity. Even though in my mirrors you will see fragments of the space that surrounds you, you’ll never get the whole picture as we cannot see and understand everything around us. The other idea is that you will stand in front of these sculptures made of hundreds of mirrors but you will not see yourself reflected in them because of the way they are arranged. That relates to the idea of aniconism."

Gallery

References

See also
Glass mosaic, a similar Burmese mosaic technique

Interior design
Persian art
Mirrors
Islamic art
Mosaic
Glass art